The American Basketball Association (ABA) Finals were the championship series of the ABA, a  professional basketball league, in which two teams played each other for the title. The ABA was formed in the fall of 1967, and the first ABA Finals were played at the end of the league's first season in the spring of 1968. The league ceased operations in 1976 with the ABA–NBA merger and four teams from the ABA continued play in the National Basketball Association.

All ABA Finals were in best-of-seven format and were contested between the winners of the Eastern Division and the Western Division finals. The only teams to win the championship more than once were the Indiana Pacers and the New York Nets. The Indiana Pacers initially played in the ABA Finals in 1969, which they lost to the Oakland Oaks, but they won the championship the next year against the Los Angeles Stars. They won in the ABA Finals again in 1972, their first after moving to the Western Division, against the New York Nets and won their final ABA championship against the Kentucky Colonels in 1973. The New York Nets won their first championship in 1974 against the Utah Stars, and their second against the Denver Nuggets in 1976.

The last ABA Finals were in 1976, after which the ABA–NBA merger took place; three of the four teams that continued into the NBA made it to or won the ABA Finals.

Key

Champions

With the ABA cut down to seven teams by the middle of its final season, the league abandoned divisional play.

Results by teams

Notes
 The Indiana Pacers moved from the Eastern Division to the Western Division between the 1969–1970 and 1970–1971 seasons.

See also

American Basketball Association
ABA Playoffs MVP

References

External links
Professional Basketball Championships
ABA seasons

American Basketball Association lists